Ekenedilichukwu Ugochukwu Eric Nwenweh, (born 28 February 1985) professionally known as Ken Erics Ugo or simply Ken Erics is a Nigerian film and television actor, writer, producer and occasional musician. He is popularly known for his role as Ugo in the movie 'The Illiterate' alongside Tonto Dikeh and Yul Edochie. He is from Anambra State.

Early life
Ken Erics was born in Kano State, Northwest Nigeria on 28 February 1985 and is the sixth of seven children of Eric Chukwuemeka Nwenweh and Grace Ifeyinwa Nwenweh both of Enugwu-Ukwu in Anambra State, Southeast Nigeria. He is of Igbo descent. Erics had his primary education at Binta Mustapha Science Nursery and Primary School, Kano, and his secondary education at Dennis Memorial Grammar School (DMGS) Onitsha, Anambra State. As a young child, Erics showed a passion for the arts, and this culminated in his admission to the Nnamdi Azikiwe University, Awka, Anambra State, where he graduated with a degree in Theatre Arts. He also holds a master's degree in Theatre and Film studies.

Career

In 2001, as a first year student in the university, Erics got his first movie role, in the Chris Ubani directed 'direct-to-DVD' movie 'Holy Prostitute', where he played a minor role as a medical doctor, with just three scenes. He went on to graduate from the university and began to attend auditions and bagged a few other cameo roles in home movies. However, his 2012 portrayal of "Ugo" in the movie 'The Illiterate endeared him to audiences and opened up more opportunities for him in the Nigerian movie industry.

As a writer, Erics first published work Cell 2 has gained attention and has been used in a number of Nigerian tertiary institutions for stage productions and academic purposes.

As an occasional singer and musician who plays the guitar and keyboard, Erics, who had earlier run his own musical band, has been involved in the production of a number of original movie soundtracks.

He also has acted alongside top movie stars like; Ngozi Ezeonu, Yul Edochie, Desmond Elliot, Chiwetalu Agu, Regina Daniels and more.

In 2014, Erics won the award for Best Supporting Actor at the City People Entertainment Award, as well as the Best Lead Actor at the Afrifimo Awards in the United States. In 2015, he went on to win the Best Lead Actor award at the City People Entertainment Award.

In 2017, Erics won the City People Entertainment Awards 2017 for Best Actor of the Year and was also nominated for the Golden Movie Awards in 2018 for Best supporting Actor.

In December 2018, Ken Erics released his first music single Inozikwa Omee after he became a superstar, because he has been making music before he came to lime light. Inozikwa Omee got his fans applauding his debut single. The sensational tune accompanied with very melodious vocals is a clear indication Ken Erics is not going anywhere anytime soon.

In March 2019, Ken Erics announced that he will no longer continue his marriage to his wife, Onyi Adada. According to the Actor it became important to leave his marriage after things turned unbearable. He however, expressed happiness over ending the union.

Awards

FilmographyMovie RolesTelevision RolesStage Plays'''

Discography

Selected singlesInozikwa Omee (2018)Thank You Baba (2019)Mama (2019)Many Mysteries (2019)Sugarcane Baby (2019)Pretence (2019)Anom Gi N’aka (2019)Love is Life'' (2019)

References

External links
 

Living people
Nigerian male film actors
Nigerian male musicians
Nigerian male writers
Igbo male actors
1985 births
Nnamdi Azikiwe University alumni
Actors from Anambra State
Nigerian film producers
Nigerian television actors
Igbo musicians
Nigerian actor-politicians
Nigerian politicians
Nigerian writers
Nigerian musicians
21st-century Nigerian actors
Nigerian film award winners